The II Mexican National Open Championship 1965 was a badminton competition held in November 1965 in Mexico City.

In the men's singles event, the semi-finalists were the World number one Erland Kops, Channarong Ratanaseangsuang, Don Paup and Antonio Rangel. Erland Kops defeated (15-2, 15-4) Antonio Rangel, while Channarong Ratanaseangsuang won to Don Paup (15-1, 15-10). In the final, Erland Kops showed off his class against Channarong Ratanaseangsuang.

In the men's doubles category, the Mexican brothers Antonio Rangel and Raúl Rangel lost in semi-finals (15-2, 15-4) against the future winners Erland Kops and Don Paup.

In the semi-finals of the women's singles category, the American Dorothy O´Neil defeated the Mexican Carolina Allier 7-11, 11-8, 12-11.

Finalists

References 

Mexican National Open Championship 1965
Badminton tournaments in Mexico
1965 in Mexican sports